Charles Meyer (16 March 1868 – 31 January 1931) was a Danish racing cyclist. He won the 560 km long Bordeaux–Paris in 1895, and finished second in the 1896 Paris–Roubaix and fifth in the 1898 race.

References

External links
 

1868 births
1931 deaths
Danish male cyclists
People from Flensburg